Dashnyamyn Olzvoi (born 20 April 1949) is a Mongolian boxer. He competed in the men's light middleweight event at the 1976 Summer Olympics. At the 1976 Summer Olympics, he lost to Rolando Garbey of Cuba.

References

1949 births
Living people
Mongolian male boxers
Olympic boxers of Mongolia
Boxers at the 1976 Summer Olympics
Place of birth missing (living people)
Light-middleweight boxers
20th-century Mongolian people